Yekemi Otaru(née Awoseyin) is an entrepreneur, author.She is the co-founder and executive director at Doqaru limited. In 2021,she became the Chancellor of University of the West of Scotland.

Early life and education
Yekemi was born to Raphael Awoseyin from Ayedeun town of Oke Ero Local Government,Kwara State. She studied chemical engineering at  the University of Benin (Nigeria) where she obtained a bachelor’s degree ,then proceeded to receive an MBA from Henley Business School.

References

Living people
Nigerian writers
University of Benin (Nigeria) alumni
Year of birth missing (living people)